Tulip Thong (lit: "Golden Tulip")  is a 2017 Thai TV series or lakorn broadcast on Thailand's Channel 7 starting November 3, 2017 at 20:15 ICT (falls on a Loy Kratong night) on Fridays, Saturdays and Sundays directed and produced by Philip Chalong.

Synopsis
Golden Tulip is a beauty gem hidden secret. Everybody involved with it will die, now its in the possession of a young designer. Her father, a Dutch scientist who died mysteriously in Thailand and she was bullied by the villains. She decided to come to Thailand for investigated under protected of the Thai police.

Cast
Ek Rangsiroj as Phum Phatthanayuth (Phum)
Sornsin Maneewan as Phanmanee (Punch)
Dom Hetrakul as Pol. Capt. Chakri 
Talika Chindachia as Lisa Schnieder
Marisa Anita as Maria
Kanokkorn Jaicheun as Fah
Kamonwan Srivilai as Pol. Sub. Lt. Orawan WRTP (lieutenant Orn)
Ah-Tsui Sianglor as Sergeant Chai
Krung Srivilai as Pee Pleum (old brother Pleum)
Art Supawatt Purdy as Marko
Theerathun Khajornchaidejawat as Pete
Thasachai Chanaathakarn as Kao-yod (Sia Kao)
Korakot Thanapat as Tommy
Joe Bangbon as White
Aon Angkor as Red
Num Benzu as Blue
Thanadej Tasomboon as Black
Chris Kunanukorn as Johan
Kawin Thanapat as Michael Lee
Ekapun Bunluerit as Capt. Payaktape (Capt. Suea)
Nattakit Promdontree as Yuth
Amot Intanont as Tat
Pongsanart Vinsiri as Hia Soi (big brother Soi)
Keetapat Untimanon as Natalee Bosovick 
Park Smith as Alex
Michael Corp Dyrendal as Mr. Park
Chalee Kreechai as Hatu
Ravisara Insee as Subee
Chakthip Thongthip as Bajoh
Roy van der Wal as Roy Ramos
Pichet Sriracha as Inspector Kanchanaburi
Sot Chitalada as Punch and Pete's father (cameo)

Production
Tulip Thong is an action-drama series directed and produced by Philip Chalong, an elder director who has been nicknamed "Action Film Tycoon".  It's produced by  Insee Audio Vision Co., Ltd. the company after the last name of his wife. It was made with a budget of over 10 million baht and went on a filming to the Netherlands for three weeks. It started filming in August 2016 and the first role of Talika "Som" Chindachia.

References

External links
  

2017 Thai television series debuts
2017 Thai television series endings
Thai television soap operas
Thai action television series
2010s Thai television series
Channel 7 (Thailand) original programming